A pronunciation respelling for English is a notation used to convey the pronunciation of words in the English language, which does not have a phonemic orthography (i.e. the spelling does not reliably indicate pronunciation).

There are two basic types of pronunciation respelling:
 "Phonemic" systems, as commonly found in American dictionaries, consistently use one symbol per English phoneme.  These systems are conceptually equivalent to the International Phonetic Alphabet (IPA) commonly used in bilingual dictionaries and scholarly writings but tend to use symbols based on English rather than Romance-language spelling conventions (e.g. ē for IPA ) and avoid non-alphabetic symbols (e.g. sh for IPA ).
 On the other hand, "non-phonemic" or "newspaper" systems, commonly used in newspapers and other non-technical writings, avoid diacritics and literally "respell" words making use of well-known English words and spelling conventions, even though the resulting system may not have a one-to-one mapping between symbols and sounds.

Development and use
Pronunciation respelling systems for English have been developed primarily for use in dictionaries. They are used there because it is not possible to predict with certainty the sound of a written English word from its spelling or the spelling of a spoken English word from its sound. So readers looking up an unfamiliar word in a dictionary may find, on seeing the pronunciation respelling, that the word is in fact already known to them orally. By the same token, those who hear an unfamiliar spoken word may see several possible matches in a dictionary and must rely on the pronunciation respellings to find the correct match.

Traditional respelling systems for English use only the 26 ordinary letters of the Latin alphabet with diacritics, and are meant to be easy for native readers to understand. English dictionaries have used various such respelling systems to convey phonemic representations of the spoken word since Samuel Johnson published his Dictionary of the English Language in 1755, the earliest being devised by James Buchanan us be featured in his 1757 dictionary Linguæ Britannicæ Vera Pronunciatio, although most words therein were not respelled but given diacritics; since the language described by Buchanan was that of Scotland, William Kenrick responded in 1773 with A New Dictionary of the English Language, wherein the pronunciation of Southern England was covered and numbers rather than diacritics used to represent vowel sounds; Thomas Sheridan devised a simpler scheme, which he employed in his successful 1780 General Dictionary of the English Language, a much larger work consisting of two volumes; in 1791 John Walker produced A Critical Pronouncing Dictionary, which achieved a great reputation and ran into some forty editions. Today, such systems remain in use in American dictionaries for native English speakers, but they have been replaced by the International Phonetic Alphabet (IPA) in linguistics references and many bilingual dictionaries published outside the United States.

The pronunciation which dictionaries refer to is some chosen "normal" one, thereby excluding other regional accents or dialect pronunciation. In England this standard is normally the Received Pronunciation, based upon the educated speech of southern England. The standard for American English is known as General American (GA).

Sophisticated phonetic systems have been developed, such as James Murray's scheme for the original Oxford English Dictionary, and the IPA, which replaced it in later editions and has been adopted by many British and international dictionaries. The IPA system is not a respelling system, because it uses symbols not in the English alphabet, such as ð and θ. Most current British dictionaries use IPA for this purpose.

Traditional respelling systems
The following chart matches the IPA symbols used to represent the sounds of the English language with the phonetic symbols used in several dictionaries, a majority of which transcribe American English.

These works adhere (for the most part) to the one-symbol-per-sound principle. Other works not included here, such as Webster's New Twentieth Century Dictionary of the English Language (unabridged, 2nd ), do not adhere and thus have several different symbols for the same sound (partly to allow for different phonemic mergers and splits).

Title abbreviations
 IPA – Compromise dialect-neutral English pronunciation using the International Phonetic Alphabet (IPA), as used in Wikipedia.
 K&K – General American pronunciation using symbols largely corresponding to those of the IPA in A Pronouncing Dictionary of American English (also referred to as Kenyon and Knott) (1944 [1953]), John S. Kenyon, Thomas A. Knott.  Springfield, Massachusetts: Merriam-Webster.
 APA – Americanist phonetic notation, used primarily in linguistics literature in the U.S.
 NOAD – New Oxford American Dictionary (2001, 2005, 2010).  New York: Oxford University Press. (Diacritical transcription).
 AHD – American Heritage Dictionary of the English Language (2000). Boston: Houghton-Mifflin. Also used by the Columbia Encyclopedia.
 RHD – Random House Dictionary of the English Language (1966).
 WBO – World Book Online (1998).
 MECD – Microsoft Encarta College Dictionary.
 DPL – Dictionary of Pronunciation, Abraham Lass and Betty Lass.
 DPN – Dictionary of Pronunciation, Samuel Noory.
 TBD – Thorndike Barnhart Dictionary.
 NBC – NBC Handbook of Pronunciation.
 MWCD – Merriam-Webster's Collegiate Dictionary.
 COD – The Concise Oxford Dictionary (1964 [1974]), 5th edition, E. McIntosh, ed. Oxford: OUP. (This notation was used up to the 7th edition; newer editions use the IPA.)
 POD – The Pocket Oxford Dictionary (2006), 2nd edition, E. Jewell, Oxford: OUP.
 Cham – The Chambers Dictionary (2003).
 CPD – The Chambers Paperback Dictionary (2012).
 SD – Scholastic Dictionary.
 AB – ARPABET, a commonly used computerized encoding of English pronunciation. It is used by the CMU Pronouncing Dictionary.
 Dictcom – Dictionary.com uses a custom phonetic alphabet.
 BBC – BBC Phonetic Respelling.
 Google – Google's pronunciation dictionary.
 Mac - Macquarie Dictionary's "say" respelling system.
 Wikipedia – Wikipedia Pronunciation Respelling Key, used in some Wikipedia articles to spell out the pronunciations of English words.

Notes

Pronunciation without respelling

Some dictionaries indicate hyphenation and syllabic stress in the headword. A few have even used diacritics to show pronunciation "without respelling" in the headwords.

The Concise Oxford Dictionary, 1st through 4th edition, used a mix of two systems.  Some editions of Webster's Unabridged Dictionary have offered a method for teachers to indicate pronunciation without respelling as a supplement to the respelling scheme used in the dictionary.  Pronunciation without respelling is also sometimes used in texts with many unusual words, such as Bibles, when it is desirable to show the received pronunciation. These will often be more exhaustive than dictionary respelling keys because all possible digraphs or readings need to have a unique spelling.

{| class="wikitable floatleft" style="margin-left: 4em"
|+ Concise Oxford Dictionary'''s system without respelling
|-
! COD variant || IPA
|-
| ph || 
|-
| kn (initial) || 
|-
| wr (initial) || 
|-
| g, dg ||  (before e, i, y)   otherwise  
|-
| c ||  (before e, i, y)    otherwise  
|-
| ai, ay  || 
|-
| air || 
|-
| ae, ea, ee, ie || 
|-
| ė, ie (final), ey                || 
|-
| ear, eer, ier                    || 
|-
| aw                               || 
|-
| oy                               || 
|-
| ou                               || 
|-
| i͡r, u͡r                         || 
|-
| eu, ew                           || 
|}

International Phonetic Alphabet
The International Phonetic Alphabet is a standardized method of phonetic transcription developed by a group of English and French language teachers in 1888. In the beginning, only specialized pronunciation dictionaries for linguists used it, for example, the English Pronouncing Dictionary edited by Daniel Jones (EPD, 1917).  The IPA, used by English teachers as well, started to appear in popular dictionaries for learners of English as a foreign language such as the Oxford Advanced Learner's Dictionary (1948) and Longman Dictionary of Contemporary English (1978).

IPA is very flexible and allows for a wide variety of transcriptions between broad phonemic transcriptions which describe the significant units of meaning in language and phonetic transcriptions which may indicate every nuance of sound in detail.

Many phoneticians preferred a qualitative system, which used different symbols to indicate vowel timbre and colour. A. C. Gimson introduced a quantitative-qualitative IPA notation system when he took over editorship of the EPD (13th edition, 1967); and by the 1990s, the Gimson system had become a de facto standard for phonetic notation of British Received Pronunciation (RP).

The first native (not learner's) English dictionary using IPA may have been the Collins English Dictionary (1979), and others followed suit.  The Oxford English Dictionary, 2nd edition (OED2, 1989) used IPA, transcribed letter-for-letter from entries in the first edition, which had been noted in a scheme by the original editor, James Murray.

While IPA has not been adopted by popular dictionaries in the United States, there is a demand for learner's dictionaries which provide both British and American English pronunciation.  Some dictionaries, such as the Cambridge English Pronouncing Dictionary and the Longman Dictionary of Contemporary English provide a separate transcription for each.

British and American English dialects have a similar set of phonemes, but some are pronounced differently; in technical parlance, they consist of different phones.  Although developed for RP, the Gimson system being phonemic, it is not far from much of General American pronunciation as well. A number of recent dictionaries, such as the Collins COBUILD Advanced Learner's English Dictionary, add a few non-phonemic symbols  to represent both RP and General American pronunciation in a single IPA transcription.

Clive Upton updated the Gimson scheme, changing the symbols used for five vowels. He served as pronunciation consultant for the influential Concise Oxford English Dictionary, which adopted this scheme in its ninth edition (1995). Upton's reform is controversial: it reflects changing pronunciation, but critics say it represents a narrower regional accent, and abandons parallelism with American and Australian English.

Upton outlined his reasons for the transcription in a chapter of A Handbook of Varieties of English.  He said that the -vowel represented how the starting point could be anything from centralised front to centralised back.  The change in the NURSE vowel was intended as a simplification as well as a reflection that  was not the only possible realisation in RP.  The other alterations were intended to reflect changes that have occurred over time.

The in-progress 3rd edition of the Oxford English Dictionary uses Upton's scheme for representing British pronunciations.  For American pronunciations it uses an IPA-based scheme devised by Prof. William Kretzschmar of the University of Georgia.

Comparison

Dictionaries for English-language learners

For many English language learners, particularly learners without easy Internet access, dictionary pronunciation respelling are the only source of pronunciation information for most new words.  Which respelling systems are best for such learners has been a matter of debate.

In countries where the local languages are written in non-Latin, phonemic orthographies, various other respelling systems have been used.  In India, for example, many English bilingual dictionaries provide pronunciation  respellings in the local orthography.   This is the case for several  Indian languages, including Hindi, Urdu, Malayalam, and Tamil. To reduce the potential distortions of bilingual phonemic transcription, some dictionaries  add English letters to the local-script respellings to represent sounds not specified in the local script. For example, in English-Tamil dictionaries,  the sounds /b/ and /z/ need to be specified, as in this respelling of busy: "bz".

Because these respellings primarily use symbols already known to anyone with minimal literacy in the local language, they are more practical to use in such contexts than the IPA or the Latin respelling systems with diacritics.  Another advantage of local-script respellings for English learners is that they retain the "flavour" of local English speech, allowing learners to make connections between their spoken and written English experiences.  However, these systems also have limitations. One limitation is that they do not illuminate the  English writing system.  Like the IPA, they represent phonemes differently from the ways in which the phonemes are normally spelled. So these notations do not guide readers to infer the regularities of English spelling.   Also, the practicality of these systems for learning English locally may be offset by difficulties in communication with people used to different norms such as General American or Received Pronunciation.

Children's dictionaries

Most beginner dictionaries are picture dictionaries, or word books.  For preliterate native speakers of a language, the pictures in these dictionaries both define the entry words and are the "keys" to their pronunciation.  Respellings for English begin to appear in dictionaries for novice readers.  Generally, US-based dictionaries contain pronunciation information  for all headwords, while UK-based dictionaries provide pronunciation information only for unusual (e.g., ache) or ambiguously spelled (e.g., bow) words.

As the normal age of literacy acquisition varies among languages, so do the age-range designations of children's books.  Generally, age ranges for young children's books in English lag behind those of  languages with phonemic orthographies by about a year. This corresponds to the slow pace of literacy acquisition among English speakers as compared to speakers of languages with phonemic orthographies, such as Italian. Italian children are expected to learn to read within  the first year of elementary school,  whereas English-speaking children are expected to read by the end of third grade. Pronunciation respellings begin to appear in dictionaries for children in third grade and up.

There seems to be very little research on which respelling systems are most useful for children, apart from two small studies done in the 1980s and 1990s.  Both studies were limited to traditional respelling systems without diacritics (setting aside both the IPA and the Webster-based systems used in American dictionaries). Both studies found that in such systems, word respellings may be cumbersome and ambiguous, as in this respelling of psychology: "suy-kol-uh-jee".

The authors of the two studies proposed alternative systems, though there were no follow-up studies. Yule's "cut system" leaves out extra letters, adds specific spellings for sounds with variable spellings, and adds accents to show long vowels, as in this respelling of occasion: o-cà-zhon.   Fraser advocated a "non-phonemic" approach using a small set of common spelling patterns in which words would be respelled chunk by chunk, rather than phoneme by phoneme, as in this respelling of persiflage: per-sif-large.   According to both authors, the reduced vowel (schwa) does not need to be shown in a respelling so long as syllabification and syllable stress are shown.

The following overlapping issues concerning pronunciation respelling in children's dictionaries were directly raised by Yule and Fraser: the level of difficulty, the type of notation, the degree of divergence from regular spelling, and pronunciation norms. Yule also raised the question of the types of impact respelling systems could have on children's literacy acquisition.  These issues could be usefully addressed in studies that include American respelling systems as well as the IPA.

An issue that has arisen since the Yule and Fraser studies concerns the utility of pronunciation respellings given the availability of audio pronunciations in online dictionaries. Currently, the advantage of written respellings is that they may be read phoneme by phoneme, in parallel to the way novice readers are taught to "stretch out" words to hear all the sounds they contain, while the audio pronunciations are given only as whole words spoken in real time. When audio pronunciations are made flexible, it will become possible to study and compare the utility of different combinations of pronunciation features in the online children's dictionaries.

Other uses
Anglophone press agencies, such as the Voice of America, periodically release lists of respelled given names of internationally relevant people, in order to help news TV and radio announcers and spokespersons to pronounce them as closely as possible to their original languages.

See also
 English spelling reform
 International Phonetic Alphabet
 International Phonetic Alphabet chart for English dialects
 SAMPA
 ARPABET
 English pronunciation of Greek letters
 Help:IPA/English
 Help:Pronunciation respelling key
 Help:IPA/Conventions for English

References

Sources

 Wells, John (2001). "IPA transcription systems for English", at University College London Department of Phonetics and Linguistics site.  Retrieved 2006-08-16.

 

 Antimoon.com. "Introduction to phonetic transcription", at Antimoon.com''.  Retrieved 2006-08-16.
 Oxford English Dictionary. "Pronunciation", from the Preface to the Third Edition.  Retrieved 2006-09-10.
 Oxford English Dictionary. "Key for Second Edition Entries", from the OED website.  Retrieved 2014-11-21.
 Oxford English Dictionary. "Key to New Edition Entries", from the OED website.  Retrieved 2014-11-21.
 Merriam-Webster Online, n.d. "Pronunciation Overview", Retrieved 2011-07-23.

External links
 Merriam-Webster Online, Pronunciation Overview, Pronunciation Guide, Guide to Pronunciation
 Pronunciation Guides in Children's Dictionaries
 Key to the Pronunciation, Oxford English Dictionary
 The use of Phonetic and other Symbols in Dictionaries: A brief survey
Pronunciation key, the Free Dictionary
 PhoTransEdit – English Phonetic Transcription Editor : PhoTransEdit is a free tool created to make typing phonetic transcriptions easier. It includes automatic phonemic transcription (in RP and General American) of English texts and an IPA phonetic keyboard to edit them. The transcription can be pasted into other editors (e.g. Microsoft Word) or exported to use it in HTML pages.
 IPA Phonetic Transcription of English text: Online converter of English text into its phonetic transcription using International Phonetic Alphabet (British and American dialects).

Phonetic alphabets
English phonology
American English
Phonetic guides
English orthography